The Federal University of Tocantins (UFT) is the public, federal university of the state of Tocantins, in Brazil. The university has campuses spread throughout the entire state, as in Araguaína, Arraias, Gurupi, Miracema, Palmas, Porto Nacional and Tocantinópolis.

External links 

  

Universidade Federal do Tocantins
Federal universities of Brazil
Educational institutions established in 2000
2000 establishments in Brazil
Palmas, Tocantins